Daneka Wipiiti (born 8 December 1982 in Hamilton, New Zealand) is a former New Zealand international netball player who played for the New Zealand national netball team, the Silver Ferns, and the Southern Steel in the ANZ Championship.

Wipiiti started her netball career in 1998 for the Western Flyers as a 15-year-old in the National Bank Cup.  She transferred to the Northern Force in 2002, playing with them until 2006. In 2007, Wipiiti joined the National Bank Cup–winning Southern Sting, coached by Robyn Broughton. She stayed in Southland with the start of the ANZ Championship in 2008, joining the new Southern Steel franchise.

Wipiiti was a surprise name in the Silver Ferns for the 2002 Commonwealth Games at only 19 years of age. She was dropped in 2003, and played with the New Zealand A team from 2004 to 2006. She regained her position in the Silver Ferns in 2008, but pulled out the following year due to pregnancy, before returning in 2010.

References

External links
2011 Silver Ferns profile
2010 ANZ Championship season

New Zealand netball players
Southern Steel players
ANZ Championship players
New Zealand international netball players
Commonwealth Games gold medallists for New Zealand
Commonwealth Games silver medallists for New Zealand
Netball players at the 2002 Commonwealth Games
Netball players at the 2010 Commonwealth Games
Sportspeople from Hamilton, New Zealand
1982 births
Living people
Commonwealth Games medallists in netball
Hunter Jaegers players
New Zealand expatriate netball people in Australia
Northern Force players
Rugby union players' wives and girlfriends
Western Flyers players
Southern Sting players
Medallists at the 2002 Commonwealth Games
Medallists at the 2010 Commonwealth Games